Jean-Baptiste Nicolet (16 April 1728 – 27 December 1796) was an 18th-century French actor and manager. He was the eldest son of puppeteer, dance master and violinist Guillaume Nicolet. He set up the Grands-Danseurs du Roi, the predecessor of the Théâtre de la Gaîté.

External links 
 Jean-Baptiste Nicolet on data.bnf.fr
 Nicolet at Père Lachaise Cemetery

Male actors from Paris
1728 births
1796 deaths
French theatre managers and producers
18th-century French male actors
French male stage actors
Burials at Père Lachaise Cemetery
18th-century theatre managers